The Winter Fortress: The Epic Mission to Sabotage Hitler’s Atomic Bomb  is a 2016 military history book by Neal Bascomb.  It tells the story of the Norwegian operation to sabotage the Vemork heavy water plant during World War II.

References

Books about World War II
2016 non-fiction books
American non-fiction books
Non-fiction books about war
Houghton Mifflin books